Antennarius biocellatus, commonly known as the brackish-water frogfish or the fishing frog, is a species of fish in the family Antennariidae. Unusually among anglerfishes, it occurs in brackish and occasionally freshwater environments. It is native to the Western Pacific, being known from New Guinea, Indonesia, the Solomon Islands, the Philippines, and Taiwan. It has also been reported from Palau. This species is most frequently seen and collected at depths of less than 10 m (33 ft), and it reaches 14 cm (5.5 inches) SL.

The brackish-water frogfish is a variably-colored anglerfish that usually sports one or two ocelli on its dorsal fin. It is an oviparous species that either produces ribbon-like sheaths or large masses of mucus known as "rafts" or "veils" to bind its eggs.

Gallery

References 

Fish of the Pacific Ocean
Fish described in 1817
Antennariidae
Taxa named by Georges Cuvier